Dr. M. Rafiqul Islam (Bengali: এম রফিকুল ইসলাম) is a Bangladeshi academician, professor and writer. He was 8th vice-chancellor of Islamic University, Bangladesh. He is prominent professor in Economics department of Rajshahi University. He serve as vice-chancellor at Islamic University more than 2 years from 3 April 2004 to 10 July 2006.

Career 
He was President of Zia Parishad at Rajshahi University at 2012. He was the Treasurer of Pundra University of Science and Technology, Bogra in 2019.

Vice-chancellorship 
He was appointed vice-chancellor at Islamic University, Bangladesh on 3 April 2004. In November 2005, Islamic University Teachers's Associations(IUTA) accused the Vice-Chancellor M Rafiqul Islam of the varsity of corruptions and irregularities and violation of university ordinance. Islam submitted his resignation letter to the education ministry in July 2006 for pressure from local job candidates and political issues.

See also
 Shaikh Abdus Salam
Rashid Askari

References 

Bangladeshi male writers
University of Rajshahi alumni
Vice-Chancellors of the Islamic University, Bangladesh
Living people
Year of birth missing (living people)
Academic staff of the University of Rajshahi